1999 is the debut mixtape by American rapper Joey Badass. It was released on June 12, 2012. It features production by Chuck Strangers, Lewis Parker, Lord Finesse, MF DOOM and J Dilla, among others. The mixtape also features guest appearances from members of Pro Era, a hip hop collective of which Joey Badass is a member. The mixtape is based heavily around musical samples. Music videos have been released for "Hardknock", "Survival Tactics", "FromdaTomb$" and "Waves".

In May 2022, Joey Badass announced that his next album would be a sequel to 1999, named 2000. It was released shortly after 1999s tenth anniversary on July 22, 2022.

Release
1999 was a free digital download, but after B4.Da.$$ was released, 1999 and another mixtape Summer Knights became available on iTunes for sale.
On June 12, 2018, 1999 was released on Spotify and TIDAL. The instrumental of track 9 "Funky Ho's" was changed upon the re-release, removing an uncleared sample so that the album could be placed on digital streaming services and released on vinyl.

Rejex
In September 2012, Joey Badass later released a mixtape named Rejex, which contains 14 tracks of primitive recordings, or material that did not make it to the final version of 1999.

Critical reception

1999 was met with widespread critical acclaim, and general interest upon its release. The mixtape was nominated for mixtape of the year by BET. Pitchfork Media gave the mixtape an 8 out of 10 rating and praised his old soul, and Golden age sound. Tom Breihan of Stereogum wrote: "What confounds me is that a high school kid from Flatbush is making music this era-specific, and, more importantly, that he’s so good at it." Joshua R. Weaver of The Root remarked that 1999 "showcases the burgeoning renaissance of a hip-hop sound and vibe that far precedes the teenaged rapper."

Jesse Fairfax of HipHopDX opined that the mixtape's "careful tracing of long established blueprints gives rise to debate on whether the newcomer presents a worthwhile reminder of Hip Hop's so-called glory days or if he risks placing himself in a nostalgic box". Concluding the review for AllHipHop, King Eljay claimed that, "With a movement and ambition that mirrors today’s most successful artists, and a sound that is so authentic and ripe, 1999 is awesome. This is a project that will make any Hip-Hop listener excited." Christopher R. Weingarten was more critical in the review for Spin, calling it, "too often the lounge-iest in the Lyricist Lounge."

Reviewing the mixtape for AllMusic, Paul Simpson declared that it, "rightfully remains one of the most praised rap mixtapes of the 2010s." 1999 was ranked the 38th best album of 2012 by Complex. The Versed named it "Mixtape of the Year". It was also named one of the best mixtapes of the year by HipHopDX.

 Track listing 
Credits are adapted from the album's liner notes, unless otherwise indicated.Notes"FromdaTombs" features DJ scratches performed by Statik Selektah. 
On the June 12, 2018 re-release of 1999, the track "Suspect" was retitled "Third Eye Shit."Sample credits'''
"Summer Knights" contains a sample of "Summer Nights", performed by Lonnie Liston Smith.
"Waves" contains a sound bite of Tupac Shakur.
"Waves" also contains a sample of "Waves" by Freddie Joachim (Instrumental)
"FromdaTombs" contains a sample of "Main Theme (Piano & Trumpet)" by Andrew Hale, from the video game L.A. Noire''.
"Survival Tactics" contains a sample of "Survival Tactics" by Styles of Beyond.
"Killuminati" contains a sample of "WhºK∆res" by Knxwledge.
"Hardknock" contains a sample of "Eyes Of Dreams" by Lewis Parker.
"World Domination" contains dialogue excerpts from Pinky and the Brain.
"World Domination" also contains a sample of "The Fat Albert Halloween Special" by Ray Ellis, which MF DOOM had sampled before in "Poo-Putt Platter", as "Datura Stramonium" in the instrumental version.
"Pennyroyal" contains a sample of "Cathedral" by Galt MacDermot.
"Funky Ho's" contains a sample of "All Night" by Xperadó.
"Daily Routine" contains a sample of "The Highways of My Life" by The Isley Brothers.
"Snakes" contains a sample of "Alien Family" by J Dilla.
"Don't Front" contains a sample of "Tudo Que Você Podia Ser" by Lô Borges.
"Righteous Minds" contains a sample of "Holy Thursday" by David Axelrod.
"Righteous Minds" also contains samples of "Love and Happiness" by Monty Alexander and "Hit Me with That" by The Beatnuts.

Charts

See also
 Joey Badass discography

References

External links
 

2012 mixtape albums
Albums produced by Lord Finesse
Albums produced by J Dilla
Albums produced by MF Doom
Albums produced by Statik Selektah
Joey Badass albums
Cinematic Music Group albums
Pro Era albums
Albums produced by Knxwledge